Paphiopedilum bullenianum is a species of orchid native to Malesia.

References 

bullenianum
Flora of Malesia